Charles Frederick Marvin (October 7, 1858 – June 5, 1943), was an American meteorologist.

Biography
He was born at Putnam, Ohio. He graduated from Michigan State University in 1883, and was appointed to the United States Army Signal Corps of the United States Army. On July 1, 1891, an Act of Congress created the Weather Bureau from the signal service. All the men and duties relating to weather were transferred from the War Department. He became professor of meteorology in 1903 in the Weather Bureau, and chief there in 1913.

Marvin conducted important experiments for determining the amount of moisture in the air, invented instruments for automatically measuring and recording rainfall, snowfall, etc., and produced other advancements during the time when man first began the employment of powered aircraft.

Marvin wrote numerous pamphlets and papers published by the Weather Bureau. He contributed to the New International Encyclopedia.

He died at Doctors Hospital, Washington, D.C., after a month's illness.

External links
NOAA History: Profiles in Time/NWS Biographies

1858 births
1943 deaths
American meteorologists
Ohio State University alumni
People from Zanesville, Ohio